Kearny High School is a public high school in San Diego, California. Kearny High School serves students in grades 9-12 from the Linda Vista, Serra Mesa and Kearny Mesa communities. The school is part of the San Diego Unified School District. Kearny's mascot is the Komet.

The Kearny High Educational Complex is home to four small autonomous high schools: the School of Biomedical Science and Technology (BST), the School of College Connections (SCC), the School of Digital Media & Design (DMD), and the Stanley E. Foster School of Engineering, Design, and Innovation (EID). Each small school is focused on a college and career pathway and has developed its own educational philosophy. The Kearny High Educational Complex serves the Linda Vista, Serra Mesa, and Kearny Mesa communities of San Diego and is nationally recognized as one of the most successful implementations of high school reform. Kearny High is one of the premier examples of how neighborhood schools benefit from new educational models.

History
Kearny High opened its doors in 1941 in Linda Vista.  The original school was a building in the neighborhood before moving into what is now Montgomery Middle School located at 2470 Ulric Street San Diego, CA 92111. The Class of 1943, was the first graduating class.  In September 1945, Army ROTC was introduced on-campus. In 1953 the high school moved to its present location. The first class graduated from the present location in 1954, the school address was changed to "1954 Komet Way."

Naming
Kearny High School is named after General Stephen Watts Kearny, who joined the U.S. Army at the time of the War of 1812 and served through the War with Mexico.  A former military base on the land, Camp Kearny, was near where the current campus is located.

Notable teachers

Mary Viletta Hutchinson, b. in Kenesaw, Nebraska. Graduated from San Diego State University(BA) and Pomona College (MA). The class of 1965 dedicated the yearbook to her. Tess Gerritsen (an author noted below) wrote of Hutchinson's powerful and positive influence.
Maynard Glen Albertson (1918-2013), b. in Blackstone, Virginia. Joined the US Navy in 1937 and retired in 1957. He then graduated from San Diego State University and became a history teacher. He taught at Kearny for almost 20 years and had a profound influence on many who later followed him into the teaching profession.

Academics

Small schools
During the 2004-2005 school year, as part of the national "School-within-a-School" movement and with funding from the Bill and Melinda Gates Foundation, Kearny transformed from a traditional high school into a campus with four specialized small schools, each with an emphasis on a different field of study. The schools are:
 The School of Science, Connections and Technology (SCT)
 The School of Digital Media Design (DMD)
 The Stanley E. Foster School of Engineering, Innovation and Design (EID)
 The School of College Connections (SCC)

The small school system is funded by the Bill and Melinda Gates Foundation. Kearny is one of three such small schools in the San Diego area, the other two being San Diego High School and Crawford Educational Complex. The small schools are distinct from one another with different vice principals, teaching staff and course requirements. Each school offers specialized classes only available through their specific program.

Curriculum
Kearny High uses a 4x4 block schedule, which means that students are able to complete four full classes a semester (fall term and spring term) totaling eight full classes a year, rather than the traditional six year-long courses. This enables students to complete a year’s full curriculum in a more condensed term and allows them to enroll in additional electives or ROP courses. Kearny students can graduate with up to 51 college units, the equivalent of 1 full year of college.

Since Kearny has specialized academies, each school is able to offer a variety of elective courses not commonly taught in public schools. Each academy offers individual AP, ROP, and electives pertaining to their specific theme.

Exclusive to Kearny High, students who display academic excellence are able to take Mesa Fast Track their junior and senior years. This program allows students to enroll in college courses at Mesa College for both high school and college credit during the school day, and further enables the students to succeed post high school.

Demographics
Between the four small schools, the total minority enrollment is 91%, and 76% of students are economically disadvantaged. Kearny's student body is roughly 50% Latino, 20% Asian, 10% black, 10% white, and 8% Mixed Race.

Athletics
Kearny offers a wide array of sports:
 Fall: Football, Cross Country, Women's Volleyball, Women's Tennis.
 Winter: Soccer, Basketball, and Wrestling
 Spring: Track and Field, Men's Volleyball, Badminton, Softball, Baseball, Men's Golf, Men's Tennis

Kearny participates in California Interscholastic Federation (CIF) sports.

The current Athletic Director is Wrestling Coach Jonathan Sachs.

Kearny has had many notable coach/teachers. Tom Barnett graduated from Hoover High School, but taught and coached at Kearny for more than 30 years. He was preceded as football coach by the legendary Birt Slater who taught and coached from 1959 to 1977. Slater died at 89 in 2013.

Notable Achievements

 1973-74: men's basketball team was undefeated, 32-0, coached by Wayne Colborne and Tim Short. Players included Mark Hoaglin, Donald Page, Alan Rhodes, and Rick Taylor.
 1975: men's golf team was undefeated, 13-0-1, coached by Wayne Colborne and Tom Barnett. Players included Tom Zamora, Steve Olson, Chris Maggay, Terry Kersey, Cameron Fellows, Jim Spawton.

Boys Soccer - San Diego CIF Records

 December 5, 2006: Tri-City Christian vs. Kearny, Most Saves By Goalkeeper, 30 shots on goal by Kearny (Tied for 4th)
 January 6, 2007: CCPAA vs. Kearny, Most Goals Scored in a Game, 18 by Kearny (Tied for 3rd)
 January 6, 2007: CCPAA vs. Kearny, Most Assists in a Game, 17 by Kearny (1st)
 January 6, 2007: CCPAA vs. Kearny, Most Goals Scored in a Game, 6 by Osvaldo Antunez (Tied for 5th)

Notable alumni
Jonathan Perpich, Class of 1974, Actor 
Randy Rogel, Class of 1972 - Actor, Director, Writer 
Jay Trousdale, Class of 1973 - Champion High School Basketball Coach [https://www.sandiegouniontribune.com/sports/high-school-preps/story/2022-03-16/poway-high-girls-basketball-coach-jay-trousdale-retires-after-35-seasons
 Richard Alf, Co-founder and former chairman of the San Diego Comic-Con International.
Shawn Collins, former NFL player
Jack Daugherty, former MLB player - 1978 graduate 
Grady Fuson, baseball scout
 Cliff Hicks, Class of '82, played in three Super Bowls during his 9½-year NFL career.
Tess Gerritsen, Author
Harold Greene, Class of 1961. Journalist and Newscaster
 Cleavon Little, Class of 1958. (1939–1992), actor, Blazing Saddles.
Kurt Madden, Class of '73, world-champion ultra-distance runner and triathlete (inc. Ironman Hawai'i); ranked No. 1 in the world in 60-65 age-group in triathlon http://www.eastcountysports.com/2021/01/31/heartlands-madden-still-world-class/ 
 Dwight McDonald, former NFL player
 Bob Mosley, Bassist and vocalist for rock band Moby Grape and as a soloist.
 John Richardson, former NFL player
 Bob Richardson, former NFL player
 Darnay Scott, Class of '90. ex-professional football player for the Cincinnati Bengals
 Jim Smith, former NFL player
 Lucious Smith, former NFL player
 Phil Tippett, Visual Effects Artist, Model Maker (Star Wars: A New Hope, Star Wars: The Empire Strikes Back)
 Alan Trammell, Class of 1976. Hall of Fame Major League Baseball player and manager for the Detroit Tigers
 Don McManus, Class of 1977, actor

References

External links
 Kearny High School Main Site
 Kearny High School Athletic Site
 Kearny High School Foundation Site
 Kearny High Alumni Main Site

Small schools movement
High schools in San Diego
Public high schools in California
1941 establishments in California